Ralf Bartels (born 21 February 1978 in Stavenhagen, Germany, then German Democratic Republic) is a German shot putter. He became European Champion at the 2006 European Championships in Athletics in Gothenburg, Sweden after beating Belarusian Andrei Mikhnevich with a final put of 21.13 metres, two centimetres ahead of the Belarusian.

Bartels also won bronze at the 2005 World Championships in Athletics in Helsinki, with a put of 20.99 m. He had previously been a bronze medalist at the 2002 European Athletics Championships.

Competition record

External links
 
 

1978 births
Living people
People from Mecklenburgische Seenplatte (district)
People from Bezirk Neubrandenburg
German male shot putters
Sportspeople from Mecklenburg-Western Pomerania
Olympic athletes of Germany
Athletes (track and field) at the 2004 Summer Olympics
Athletes (track and field) at the 2008 Summer Olympics
Athletes (track and field) at the 2012 Summer Olympics
World Athletics Championships medalists
European Athletics Championships medalists
German national athletics champions